The South East (often hyphenated to the South-East) is the one of the six geopolitical zones of Nigeria representing both a geographic and political region of the country's inland southeast. It comprises five states – Abia, Anambra, Ebonyi, Enugu, and Imo.

The zone is bounded by the River Niger on the west, the riverine Niger Delta on the south, the flat North Central to the north, and the Cross River on the east. It is divided between the Cross–Niger transition forests ecoregions in the south and the Guinean forest–savanna mosaic in the drier north. Culturally, the vast majority of the zone falls within Igboland–the indigenous cultural homeland of the Igbo people, a group which makes up the largest ethnic percentage of the southeastern population at over 90%.

Although the South East is the smallest geopolitical zone, it contributes greatly to the Nigerian economy due to oil and natural gas reserves along with a growing industrialized economy. The region has a population of about 22 million people, around 10% of the total population of the country. Aba and Enugu are the most populous cities in the South East as well as the tenth and fourteenth most populous cities in Nigeria. Other large southeastern cities include (in order by population) Onitsha, Umuahia, Owerri, Nnewi, Awka, and Abakaliki.

Economy 
The zone has eighty five local Government area with over twenty millions population. The zone has about ten commercial cities. Apart from agriculture as the major economic activities. The zone is also known as commercial and trading zone with small and medium indigenous industries that are manufacturing goods and services. the main Agriculture products in the zone are yam, cassava, rice, cocoyam etc. The zone has solid minerals and nature resources such as Crude oil, natural gas, bauxite, iron ore, sand stone, lignite, clay, coal, tin and columbite.

The zone has recently been plagued by crisis as the call for secession and the creation of the State of the Independent people of  Biafra (IPOB) by the leader of the movement in person of Nnamdi Kanu. Nnamdi Kanu has recently declared Biafra but some leaders have declared that he doesn't represent the voice of the Igbo nation as well as lacking capacity to do so.

The (IPOB) has recently introduced the sit-at--home order in the zone to press home their demand as well as in solidarity for their leader - Nnamdi Kanu that has been detained by the Nigerian Government.

Origin and People
The South East came about with Alex Ekwueme's recommendations, although is formerly known as Eastern Nigeria, or simply East, following the division of the country into three parts in 1950s. In 1967, it was later split into three under the Gowon Administration (1967–1975). It was in 1976 that more states, including Imo and Anambra began to emerge.

South East is occupied by Igbos.

See also

Eastern Nigeria
Igboland
Alex Ekwueme
Owo

References 

Subdivisions of Nigeria